Visuospatial dysgnosia is a loss of the sense of "whereness" in the relation of oneself to one's environment and in the relation of objects to each other. Visuospatial dysgnosia is often linked with topographical disorientation.

Symptoms
The syndrome rarely presents itself the same way in every patient. Some symptoms that occur may be:
 Constructional apraxia: difficulty in constructing: drawing, copying, designs, copying 3D models
 Topographical disorientation:  difficulty finding one's way in the environment
 Optic ataxia: deficit in visually-guided reaching
 Ocular motor apraxia: inability to direct gaze, a breakdown (failure) in starting (initiating) fast eye movements
 Dressing apraxia: difficulty in dressing usually related to inability to orient clothing spatially, and to a disrupted awareness of body parts and the position of the body and its parts in relation to themselves and objects in the environment
 Right-left confusion: difficulty in distinguishing the difference between the directions left and right

Lesion areas
Studies have narrowed the area of the brain that, when damaged, causes visuospatial dysgnosia to the border of the occipito-temporoparietal region.  Predominantly, lesions (damage, often from stroke) are found in the angular gyrus of the right hemisphere (in people with left-hemisphere language), and are usually unilateral, meaning in one hemisphere of the brain.

Bilateral lesions produce more complex dysgnosic signs such as object anomia (inability to name an object), prosopagnosia (inability to recognize faces), alexia (inability to read), dressing apraxia, and memory impairment in conjunction with visuospatial dysgnosia symptoms.

Visuospatial dysgnosia has many symptoms in common with Bálint's syndrome and can present simultaneously. Visuospatial dysgnosia, along with Balint's syndrome, has been connected with Alzheimer's disease as a possible early sign of the disease. Generally, the first symptom of Alzheimer's onset is loss of memory, but visual or visuospatial dysfunction is the presenting symptom in some cases and is common later in the disease course.

Case studies

David G. Cogan, in 1979, published an extensive work describing 17 cases of visuospatial dysgnosia. Some examples of patients with visuospatial dysgnosia from Cogan's study are:
 Case Study 1: A 60-year-old man, while driving his car, became confused and lost his way in a familiar environment. He walked to the garage, located his car without difficulty but climbed into the left rear seat by mistake. He was able to drive out of the garage but found it hard to locate the wheel and ignition.
 Case Study 3: A 69-year-old man missed objects when pointing to them and made errors when trying to reach for them. But he could recognize colors and had normal visual acuity.
 Case Study 13: A 57-year-old woman with presumed Alzheimer's disease was unable to read. She could see individual letters but could not combine them into meaningful words or sentences. She could recognize objects by touch better with her eyes closed than with them open, which she often did to recognize objects. She also had object agnosia, which she overcame by touching objects to recognize them.

It can clearly be seen that visuospatial dysgnosia does not present itself in the same ways, though all of the above cases were diagnosed with the disorder and other accompanying diseases.

Therapies

For patients with visuospatial dysgnosia, the information input may be strengthened by adding tactile, motor, and verbal perceptual inputs. This comes from the general occupational therapy practice of teaching clients with intellectual dysfunctions to use the most effective combinations of perceptual input modalities, which may enable them to complete a task.

References

Dementia
Agnosia